Dr. Abdul Rauf (1931 – April 1992) was a Pakistani Muslim writer, poet, philosopher and a notable professor of Government College Lahore.  He was the Head of the English department (1986-1992) at Government College Lahore.  He has also served as the Head of department in the same field at King Abdul Aziz University, KSA.

Early life and education
Dr. Abdul Rauf was born on 17 September 1931 in Gujranwala, Pakistan (British India before Independence of Pakistan in 1947). He received his primary education from Gujranwala, and moved to Kingdom of Saudi Arabia in 1948.

Career 
Dr. Abdul Rauf served as Head of Department of English Literature and Language at Government College University, Lahore. Prior to that, we was Professor of English Language and Literature at King Abdulaziz University, Jeddah, Saudi Arabia.

Notable Works 
Dr. Abdul Rauf is co-author and a main contributor of Polymer English Grammar & Composition (1972), one of the most widely used English books at the Intermediate level in Pakistan.

In 1983, Anjum published his famous five lectures on John Milton's philosophy of education.

He is also famous for his Arabic to English translation of Busairi's Poem of the Mantle (or commonly known as Qasida Burda, a 13th-century ode).

Death 
He died in the early hours of April 25, 1992 at his home in Lahore due to a heart attack. He was 60.

References 
 https://web.archive.org/web/20070527083513/http://www.onlineislamicstore.com/b6503.html

1930 births
1992 deaths
Pakistani writers
Government College University, Lahore alumni